The 2014 Copa Gobierno de Córdoba doubles was a professional tennis competition. This was the first edition of the tournament.

Marcelo Demoliner and Nicolás Jarry won the title by defeating Hugo Dellien and Juan Ignacio Londero 6–3, 7–5 in the final.

Seeds

Draw

Draw

See also
Association of Tennis Professionals
History of tennis

References
 Main Draw

Copa San Juan Gobierno - Doubles
2014 Doubles